Jahanabad Rural District is a rural district (dehestan) in the Central District of Hirmand County, Sistan and Baluchestan province, Iran. At the 2006 census, its population was 16,438, in 3,178 families.  The rural district has 62 villages.

References 

Rural Districts of Sistan and Baluchestan Province
Hirmand County